Azerbaijani Sign Language is the sign language used by the deaf community in Azerbaijan. As with other sign languages, AİD has a unique grammar that differs from the oral languages used in the region. Although there are approximately 31,000 deaf people in Azerbaijan, most of them use Turkish Sign Language as their primary sign language. Azerbaijani Sign Language is not recognized as an official language by Azerbaijan, nor does not have any language codes.

Azerbaijani Sign Language is based on Russian Sign Language and is related to Turkish Sign Language.

History 
There are two Republican Special Boarding Schools in Azerbaijan that only serve members of the Azerbaijani deaf community. Although their sign language is not officially recognized, Azerbaijan's deaf community is a member of the World Deaf Federation (WDF). In international conferences and meetings, Russian Sign Language is used instead of Azerbaijani Sign Language.

See also
Sign language
Deafness

References 

Sign languages
Sign language isolates
Languages of Azerbaijan
Disability in Azerbaijan